One of the main drivers of the COVID-19 pandemic is Intensive Care Unit (ICU) capacity as resources such as hospital staff and personal protective equipment (PPE) are continuously used up. Although disaster planning for such a contingency had already taken place (and indeed has been updated), the sheer scale of the impact first became apparent on the state level in late November 2020.

Not least amongst the concerns is the tremendous strain on staff and the inability to transfer patients to other hospitals which are likewise swamped, a particular problem in rural states which have commensurate health care infrastructure.

So serious is the issue that Governor Newsom of California issued a strict stay-at-home order to take effect 48 hours whenever any of that state's five regions -Northern California, San Francisco Bay Area, Southern California, Greater Sacramento, San Joaquin Valley, and Southern California reach 15% remaining capacity as projections were that hospitals shall be swamped by Christmas.

References

ICU capacity